Coptops huberi is a species of beetle in the family Cerambycidae. It was described by Siess in 1970. It is known from Sri Lanka.

References

huberi
Beetles described in 1970